The  Gila National Forest is a United States National Forest in New Mexico. The Forest administration also manage the part of the Apache National Forest in New Mexico which covers 614,202 acres for a total of 3.3 million acres managed by the Gila National Forest. Within the forest, the Gila Wilderness was established in 1924 as the US's first designated wilderness. The Aldo Leopold Wilderness and Blue Range Wilderness are also found within its borders. The Blue Range Primitive Area lies within Arizona in the neighboring Apache National Forest.

Geography
The forest lies in southern Catron, northern Grant, western Sierra, and extreme northeastern Hidalgo counties in southwestern New Mexico. Forest headquarters are located in Silver City, New Mexico. There are local ranger district offices in Glenwood, Mimbres, Quemado, Reserve, Silver City, and Truth or Consequences. The Gila Cliff Dwellings National Monument is located with the Catron County section of the forest.

The forest's terrain ranges from rugged mountains and deep canyons to mesas and semi-desert.  Due to the extremely rugged terrain, the area is largely unspoiled. There are several hot springs in Gila National Forest, including Middle Fork Hot Springs, Jordan Hot Springs, and Turkey Creek Hot Springs.

Wildlife 
Gila is home to namesake wildlife that includes the Gila monster, Gila trout, Gila topminnow, several members of the Gila (western chub) genus, and the Gila woodpecker.  Other notable species include black bear, bald eagle, cougar, Coyote, spotted owl, elk, white-tailed deer, osprey, peregrine falcon, bobcat, collared peccary, Mexican gray wolf, gray fox, white-nosed coati, pronghorn, Raccoon, mule deer, bighorn sheep, and wild turkey.

Conservation Issues 
Hundreds of unregulated cattle roam freely in parts of the Gila National Forest, consuming vegetation by rivers and streams and trampling habitats. In 2022, the U.S. Forest Service used helicopters to gun down 47 of these "feral cattle".  The Forest Service proposes to use aerial gunning to kill more of these cattle again in 2023. 

In 2020, the U.S. Forest Service proposed allowing 21 herbicides within the forest, including dicamba, picloram and aminocyclopyrachlor (ACP). Dicamba is a threat to monarch butterfly habitat. ACP is a threat to ponderosa pines.

History
The Gila River Forest Reserve was established on March 2, 1899 by the General Land Office, and was renamed the Gila Forest Reserve on July 21, 1905.  The following year the forest was transferred to the U.S. Forest Service, and on March 4, 1907 it became a National Forest. Additions included Big Burros National Forest on June 18, 1908, Datil National Forest on December 24, 1931, and part of Crook National Forest on July 1, 1953.

Recreation 
The 3.5 acre (1.4 ha) Cosmic Campground is ideal for star-gazing.  In 2016, the campground was given the status of being the first International Dark Sky Sanctuary in North America.

References

External links

Vascular Plants of the Gila Wilderness
Historic American Engineering Record documentation, all filed under National Forest System Road 150, Mimbres, Grant County, NM:

 
National Forests of New Mexico
Hot springs of New Mexico
Protected areas of Grant County, New Mexico
Protected areas of Catron County, New Mexico
Protected areas of Sierra County, New Mexico
Protected areas established in 1905
1905 establishments in New Mexico Territory